White slavery refers to enslavement of European Christians primarily in the Barbary Slave Trade. It may also refer to:

Film and television:
White Slave (film), a 1985 Italian horror film
White Slaves (film), a 1937 German film  directed by Karl Anton
La esclava blanca (The White Slave), a Colombian telenovela
White Slave Ship, a 1962 film
White Slave Traffic (film), a 1926 German silent film directed by Jaap Speyer
Emanuelle and the White Slave Trade, a 1978 Italian sexploitation film 

Captivity Narratives:
The term 'white slavery' appears in captivity narratives, stories of people captured by enemies whom they generally consider uncivilized, including:
Emanuelle and the White Slave Trade, a 1978 Italian sexploitation film 
White Slave (film), a 1985 Italian horror film
White Slaves (film), a 1937 German film  directed by Karl Anton
La esclava blanca (The White Slave), a Colombian telenovela
White Slave Ship, a 1962 film
White Slave Traffic (film), a 1926 German silent film directed by Jaap Speyer
Spartan (film), a 2004 American film by David Mamet

Other uses:
 White Slave, autobiography of chef Marco Pierre White
 The White Slave, a play by Bartley Campbell
 White slave propaganda, the use of light-skinned African American slave children in abolitionist propaganda in the antebellum United States
 White slavery, a term used in the 1900s to refer to the sex trafficking of white women
 White-Slave Traffic Act, also called Mann Act, a 1910 United States federal law